Wilhelm Mahlow (born 18 January 1914, date of death unknown) was a German rower who competed in the 1936 Summer Olympics.

In 1936 he won the bronze medal as coxswain of the German boat in the coxed eight competition.

References

1914 births
Year of death missing
Coxswains (rowing)
Olympic rowers of Germany
Rowers at the 1936 Summer Olympics
Olympic bronze medalists for Germany
Olympic medalists in rowing
German male rowers
Medalists at the 1936 Summer Olympics
European Rowing Championships medalists